Ivide Kattinu Sugandam is a 1979 Indian Malayalam film,  directed by P. G. Vishwambharan. The film stars Jayan, Jayabharathi, Srividya and Sankaradi in the lead roles. The film has musical score by K. J. Joy.

Jayadevan( Jayan) mistrusts women because of his unfaithful stepmother. However he is persuaded to put aside his suspicions. He marries Indu (Jayabharathi) whom he loves very much ,but about whom he is also very possessive. One day he gets a letter from Indu's house which had been written by his brother Gopi to Indu. Jayadevan gets shocked and calls her but she knows nothing about it. At the climax Jayadevan realizes everything and apologizes to Indu.

Cast
Jayan as Jayadevan/Jayan
Jayabharathi as Indu
M. G. Soman as Gopi
Sankaradi as Sreedharan Menon
Sathaar as Ravi
Aranmula Ponnamma as Jayadevan's grandmother
Bahadoor as Raman Pilla
K. P. A. C. Azeez
Kuthiravattam Pappu as Pushkaran
Thodupuzha Vasanthy as Sarojam
Urmila as Sunitha

Soundtrack
The music was composed by K. J. Joy and the lyrics were written by Bichu Thirumala.

References

External links
 

1979 films
1970s Malayalam-language films
Films directed by P. G. Viswambharan